Stephen Bayly (born July 7, 1942) is an American film producer and director. His film Coming Up Roses was screened in the Un Certain Regard section at the 1986 Cannes Film Festival. Bayly was director of the National Film and Television School between 1998 and 2003.

Selected filmography
 Coming Up Roses (1986)
 Just Ask for Diamond (1986)
 Richard III (1995)

References

External links

1942 births
Living people
American film producers
Artists from Baltimore
Film directors from Maryland